Aukrust is a surname. Notable people with the surname include:

 Kjell Aukrust (1920–2002), Norwegian poet and artist, son of Lars
 Lars Olsen Aukrust (1886–1965), Norwegian farmer and politician
 Odd Aukrust (1915–2008), Norwegian author and economist, son of Lars
 Olav Aukrust (1883–1929), Norwegian poet, brother of Lars